François Devouassoud (September 1831 – 1905) was a French mountain guide who made many first ascents in the Alps, notably as guide to Douglas William Freshfield, who claimed that Devouassoud "was the first Alpine guide to carry his ice-axe to the snows of a distant range".

Life 
Devouassoud was born in 1831 in the hamlet of Les Barats in the Chamonix valley. The eldest of three brothers, both of whom were also guides, Devouassoud was educated at Sallanches, and subsequently at Bonneville. He passed some time in a Jesuit seminary in his youth and he contemplated becoming a priest but returned to Chamonix.

Mountaineering

Alps
He was admitted to the Compagnie des guides de Chamonix in 1849. Amongst those who sought his services in the Alps were Freshfield, W. A. B. Coolidge, Francis Fox Tuckett, Horace Walker, Adolphus Warburton Moore and Charles Comyns Tucker. Devouassoud was treasurer of the Compagnie des guides de Chamonix for ten years,<c&a2/> but refused the post of president.

Claire Engel offers the following portrait of Devouassoud, based on the account of Freshfield:

Greater Ranges
As Freshfield stated, Devouassoud was the first alpine guide to work in the greater ranges. Cunningham and Abney write that he was "the doyen of the pioneers who have set out at different times for the Caucasus, the Himalayas, New Zealand, or the Andes". In 1868 he made the first ascents of Kazbek and the east summit of Elbrus in the Caucasus.

In 1887 he was the subject of a photograph by Abney, possibly the one illustrating this article, entitled "A Chamounix Guide, Francois Devouassoud" at the 32nd Exhibition of Photographic Society of Great Britain.

First ascents
 25 August 1864 - Presanella with M. Beachcroft, Douglas William Freshfield and Horace Walker
 16 June 1865 - Grande Mèsule with G. H. Fox, Douglas William Freshfield, Francis Fox Tuckett and Peter Michel
 28 June 1865 - Pizzo Tresero (Ortles massif) with Francis Fox Tuckett, J.H. Backhouse, G.H. Fox and Peter Michel
 10 July 1866 - North-west ridge of the Bietschhorn with Charles Comyns Tucker and F. von Allmen
 27 July 1867 - Piz Badile with William Auguste Coolidge and Henri Devouassoud
 1 July 1868 - Kazbek with Douglas William Freshfield, Adolphus Warburton Moore and Charles Comyns Tucker
 31 July 1868 - North-west summit of Elbruz with Douglas William Freshfield, Adolphus Warburton Moore and Charles Comyns Tucker
 1875 - Sass Maor (Dolomites) with H. A. Beachcroft and Charles Comyns Tucker

Bibliography
C. D. Cunningham and W. de W. Abney, The Pioneers of the Alps, Boston: Estes and Lauriat, 1888.
Douglas William Freshfield, The Exploration of the Caucasus, volume 1, London: Edward Arnold, 1902.

References

1831 births
1905 deaths
Alpine guides
French mountain climbers